Royal Bavarian Jagdstaffel 23 was a "hunting group" (i.e., fighter squadron) of the Luftstreitkräfte, the air arm of the Imperial German Army during World War I. As one of the original German fighter squadrons, the unit would score a minimum of 63 verified aerial victories. They scored twelve wins over enemy observation balloons as a squadron.

In turn, their casualties for the war would amount to 14 pilots killed in action, one killed in a flying accident, nine wounded in action, and two taken prisoner of war.

History

Royal Bavarian Jagdstaffel 23 was established on 25 October 1916 at Metz-Frescaty. It would not gain a commanding officer until 17 November. The jagdstaffel finally came ready for action on the last day of the year. The following day, 1 January 1917, Jasta 23 moved into action at Puxieux. It would not score its first win until 14 February. On 4 July 1917, it was officially designated a Bavarian squadron. It joined the Bavarian Jagdgeschwader IV under command of Eduard Ritter von Schleich on 10 October 1918, and served there for the last month of the war.

Commanding officers (Staffelführer)
 Paul Backhaus, 17 November 1916 – 4 August 1917
 Otto Kissenberth, 4 August 1917 – 29 May 1918
 Heinrich Seywald, 2 June 1918 – 29 June 1918
 Fritz Krautheim, 2 July 1918 – 19 July 1918
 Heinrich Seywald, 19 July 1918 – 11 November 1918

Aerodromes
 Armee-Abteilung Strantz: 25 October 1916 – 1 January 1917
 Puxieux, Mars-la-Tour: 1 January 1917 – 14 April 1917
 Erlon, France: 16 April 1917 – 14 July 1917
 Jametz, France: 20 July 1917 – 24 November 1917
 Saint-Mard, France: 24 November 1917 – 4 February 1918
 Aniche: 6 February 1918 – 16 March 1918
 Émerchicourt, France: 17 March 1918 – 27 March 1918
 Bapaume, France: 27 March 1918 – 18 April 1918
 Epinoy, France: 18 April 1918 – 27 August 1918
 Lieu-Saint-Amand: 27 August 1918 – 25 September 1918
 Bühl, Germany: 27 September 1918 – 8 October 1918
 Harmignies, Belgium: 13 October 1918 – 5 November 1918
 Fleurs, France: 5 November 1918 – 11 November 1918

Notable members
 Otto Kissenberth Pour le Merite, Royal House Order of Hohenzollern, Iron Cross
 Balloon buster Friedrich Ritter von Röth Pour le Merite, Hohenzollern, Iron Cross, Military Order of Max Joseph
 Michael Hutterer Iron Cross
 Theodor Rumpel Iron Cross
 Johannes Janzen Iron Cross

Other aces serving in the unit were Karl Schattauer, Heinrich Seywald, Albert Haussmann, Max Gossner, and Albert Dietlen.

Aircraft

Initial equipment for Jasta 23 was the Albatros D.II fighter. Later, it would be refurnished with Pfalz D.XII and Roland D.VIa fighters.

Operations

Jasta 23 was formed in the Armee-Abteilung Strantz Sector. On 16 April 1917, it moved to the 7. Armee Sector. Its next move, on 18 July, saw it assigned to 5. Armee.

In February 1918, it moved to support 17. Armee at Aniche. On 27 September, it moved to the Armee-Abteilung A Sector; shortly thereafter, on 8 October, it moved on to work for 2. Armee until war's end.

References

Bibliography
 

23
Military units and formations established in 1916
1916 establishments in Germany
Military units and formations disestablished in 1918
Military units and formations of Bavaria